Prima Donna are an American rock and roll band from Los Angeles, formed in 2004. The band currently features singer/guitarist Kevin Preston, saxophonist/keyboardist Aaron Minton, drummer David S. Field, and bassist "Lights Out" Levine. The band have released 3 albums over their career.

History
The band formed in 2004 in Los Angeles with members Kevin Preston, Aaron Minton, Erik Arcane, David S. Field and Daniel Nyby. The band features a unique blend of saxophone, piano and organ alongside guitars, drums and bass to create what has been described as glam punk rock 'n' roll.

The band quickly gained a following and in May 2005, the band went on their first international tour in Europe with Texas Terri, with a quickly produced debut album entitled Kiss Kiss which was only sold at live shows. At the end of 2005, the band went on to play with original Sex Pistols bassist Glen Matlock and the Philistines American tour.

In 2008, the band recorded and released their true debut album, After Hours on September 2, 2008, which was produced by Messiaz and Prima Donna and was recorded at Reef Recorders. This album features re-recordings of tracks that were featured on Kiss Kiss. Kevin Preston would go on to join the Green Day side project, Foxboro Hot Tubs as their rhythm guitar player for live shows, which further boosted the profile of Prima Donna.

Prima Donna spent most of 2009 on tour, with US tours with Eddie and the Hot Rods and Duane Peters Gunfight. They would then go on to their highest profile slots yet, supporting Green Day on their European leg of their 21st Century Breakdown World Tour, with Kevin later joining the Foxboro Hot Tubs at a secret show in London during October 2009. They would go on to support Green Day on tour in 2010 throughout the Asian leg of the tour. David Nyby departed the band around this time, and was replaced by "Lights Out" Levine. After this period of extended touring, the band started recording their next album with Chris Dugan at Jingletown Studios in Oakland, California.  

Over the years, Steven Van Zandt has featured three Prima Donna songs as the 'Coolest Song in the World This Week' on his Sirius radio channel the Underground Garage.

The fourth album by the band was self titled and released in March 2018. Kevin Preston and David S. Field would then go on to playing live with Billie Joe Armstrong's new solo project, The Longshot.

Associated acts
Prima Donna has shared the stage with such notable acts as The Dollyrots, Green Day, Duff (gruppo musicale), Turbonegro, the Sonics, the Zeros, the Boys, the Weirdos, Angry Samoans, Backyard Babies, Steel Panther, the Skulls, Duane Peters, Eddie & the Hot Rods, Glen Matlock, the Vibrators, the Phenomenauts, the Joneses, Josie Cotton, Anti-Nowhere League, Texas Terri, the Undertones, the Muffs, the Stranglers, MU330, the Subhumans, Sham 69, UK Subs, Charged GBH, the Rezillos, TV Smith, the Avengers, the Business, The Libertines, 20/20, Chelsea, the Briefs, the Exploited, Toyah, 999, the Pointed Sticks, Demented Are Go, Stza Crack, the Polecats, the Electric Prunes, Nikki Corvette, Mystic Knights of the Cobra, Rikk Agnew, the Gears, Razor Dolls, Girl in a Coma, the Stitches, and the Bellrays.

Members

Current members 
 Kevin Preston – vocals, guitar (2004–present)
 Aaron Minton – saxophone, keyboards – (2004–present)
 David S. Field – drums, percussion – (2004–present)
 "Lights Out" Levine – bass guitar – (2010–present)

Former members 
 David Nyby – bass guitar (2004–2010)

Discography

After Hours (2008) 
2008 album on Acetate Records. Produced by Messiaz and Prima Donna. Tracked at Reef Recorders by Josh Achziger. Overdubbed and mixed at Toneduff Studio by Bruce Duff and Frank Meyer. Mastered at Little Red Book by Mark Chalecki. Photography by Sawa. CD design and layout by Victor Dawahare/Dynolux Design.

Track listing

All tracks are written by Kevin Preston, except where noted.

Bless this Mess (2012)
This album was released in February 2012 to positive reviews. While retaining a largely glam rock sound, this album also contains British invasion, new wave and surf rock influences.

Track listing

All tracks are written by Kevin Preston, except where noted.

Nine Lives and Forty-Fives (2015) 
Track listing

All tracks are written by Kevin Preston, except where noted.

Prima Donna (2018) 
Track listing

Singles

Gimme Christmas (2018)
7 inch single recorded containing the single Gimme Christmas and the B-side Mistletoe Blues. Re-released in December 2020.

Cruel Summer (2019)
Single containing a cover of Taylor Swift's Cruel Summer.

Atomic Love (2021)
Single containing the titular track, and the B-side He's a Rebel.

References

External links
 Official Website
 StrayDolls.com – Prima Donna Street Team

Reviews
 Kiss Kiss album:
 High Bias: 
 Veglam: 
 Full Frontal:  After Hours album:
 Sonic Ruin: 
 Big Wheel: 
 No Front Teeth: 
 Live performances:
 Sugarbuzz magazine: 
 Skratch magazine:
 October 2005
 February 2005

Rock music groups from California
Musical groups from Los Angeles
Glam punk groups